Armando Juan Mañé Evian Mokuy (born 19 September 1991) is an Equatoguinean footballer who plays as a forward for Atlético Semu and the Equatorial Guinea national team.

Club career
Mañé has played for Atarfe Industrial CF, CD Churriana de la Vega CF and La Bañeza FC in Spain, for USV Eichgraben in Austria and for Cano Sport Academy in Equatorial Guinea.

International career
Mañé made his senior debut for Equatorial Guinea on 23 March 2022, starting in a 0–3 friendly loss to Guinea-Bissau.

References

External links

1991 births
Living people
People from Mongomo
Equatoguinean footballers
Association football forwards
Atarfe Industrial CF players
Cano Sport Academy players
Tercera División players
Divisiones Regionales de Fútbol players
Equatorial Guinea international footballers
Equatoguinean expatriate footballers
Equatoguinean expatriate sportspeople in Spain
Expatriate footballers in Spain
Equatoguinean expatriates in Austria
Expatriate footballers in Austria